Macha or Mácha (Czech and Slovak feminine: Máchová) is a surname. Notable people with the surname include:

 Jan Franciszek Macha (1914–1942), Polish Roman Catholic priest
 Karel Hynek Mácha (1810–1836), Czech poet
 Ken Macha (born 1950), American baseball player
 Lewis Macha (born 1992), Zambian football player
 Marcel Mácha (born 1969), Czech football player
 Mike Macha (born 1954), American baseball player
 Otmar Mácha (1922–2006), Czech composer
 Radka Máchová (born 1949), Czech aerobatic pilot
 Vítězslav Mácha (born 1948), Czech wrestler

See also

References

Czech-language surnames
Polish-language surnames